Lanistes stuhlmanni is a species of large freshwater snail, an aquatic gastropod mollusk with a gill and an operculum in the family Ampullariidae, the apple snails.

It is endemic to Tanzania.

References

Fauna of Tanzania
Ampullariidae
Taxonomy articles created by Polbot